Gunnar Gerring (25 October 1916 – 16 April 2009) was a Swedish diplomat.

Career
Gerring was born on 25 October 1916 in Stockholm, Sweden, the son of lector, PhD Hugo Gerring and his wife Hillan (née Åström). He passed studentexamen in 1934 and the reserve officers exam in 1939 (he was a lieutenant in the cavalry reserve 1942-1953) and received a Candidate of Law degree from Uppsala University in 1939. Gerring conducted clerkship at Stockholm City Court from 1940 to 1942 before becoming an attaché at the Ministry for Foreign Affairs in 1942.

He served in Hamburg in 1942, Moscow in 1943, Budapest in 1946 and was Second Secretary at the Swedish Foreign Ministry in 1947. Gerring was Embassy Secretary in Washington, D.C. in 1949, in Ankara in 1951 and was First Secretary at the Foreign Ministry in 1952. He was First Embassy Secretary in Bern in 1957, First Secretary at the Foreign Ministry in 1959 and Embassy Counsellor in Bonn in 1962. After that Gerring was Ambassador in Sofia from 1964 to 1969, in Baghdad and Kuwait City from 1969 to 1973 and attended Swedish National Defence College in 1974. He was head of the Swedish Delegation to the Neutral Nations Supervisory Commission (NNSC) in Korea from 10 April 1974 to 30 April 1975, served at the Foreign Ministry in 1975 and was Ambassador in Wellington (also accredited to Suva, Nukuʻalofa and Apia) from 1979 to 1982.

Other work
Gerring was also a member of the Swedish-Hungarian Intergovernmental Commission in 1948 and was representative in trade negotiations with Bulgaria in 1947 and in 1949, with Hungary in 1947 and with Yugoslavia in 1948 and 1949. He was also Secretary of the UN delegation in Paris in 1948 and New York City in 1950. He was assistant lecturer at the Swedish National Defence College from 1961 to 1962.

Personal life
In 1951 he married Ingrid Wikander (1919–2010). He was the father of Erik Gunnar (born 1952) and Carl Gustaf (born 1954). Gerring died on 16 April 2009 in Nacka Parish in Stockholm and was buried at Nacka norra cemetery.

Awards and decorations
Knight of the Order of the White Rose of Finland
Knight of the Order of the White Lion

References

1916 births
2009 deaths
Ambassadors of Sweden to Bulgaria
Ambassadors of Sweden to Iraq
Ambassadors of Sweden to Kuwait
Ambassadors of Sweden to New Zealand
Ambassadors of Sweden to Fiji
Ambassadors of Sweden to Tonga
Ambassadors of Sweden to Samoa
People from Stockholm
Uppsala University alumni